Conception Point is the northernmost point on Coronation Island in the South Orkney Islands. It was discovered on 8 December 1821, in the course of the joint cruise by Captain George Powell, British sealer, and Captain Nathaniel Palmer, American sealer. It was named by Captain Powell.

References

 

Coronation Island
Headlands of the South Orkney Islands